Tim Siekman (born 25 May 1990) is a Dutch professional footballer who plays as a centre back for Lommel SK in the Dutch Eredivisie. He formerly played for Topklasse side HHC Hardenberg.

Career

Lommel SK
While looking for a new club, Siekman kept training with FC Emmen although his contract had expired. On 4 September 2019, Siekman joined Belgian club Lommel SK.

References

External links
 
 Voetbal International profile 

1990 births
Living people
Association football central defenders
Dutch footballers
Dutch expatriate footballers
Eredivisie players
Eerste Divisie players
Challenger Pro League players
FC Emmen players
HHC Hardenberg players
Lommel S.K. players
Dutch expatriate sportspeople in Belgium
Expatriate footballers in Belgium
Footballers from Emmen, Netherlands